Jaan-E-Bahaar is a 1979 Bollywood film directed by Prakash Kapoor.

Cast
G. Asrani  
Manju Asrani as Mona 
Bhagwan   
Jagdeep as Mithailal (Rai's Manager) 
Kanhaiyalal   
Pinchoo Kapoor as Mr. Rai 
Padma Khanna as Dancer / Singer 
Viju Khote   
Mehmood Jr. as himself 
Indrani Mukherjee as Mrs. Rai 
Paintal as Champion Hawawala 
Lalita Pawar as Gopal's mom 
Madan Puri as Ajit's maternal uncle 
Sachin as Gopal "Gopi" 
Sarika as Kuku Rai

Songs
"Hey Aankhe Churaao Na Dhaman Bachao Na" - Bappi Lahiri, Lata Mangeshkar
"O Go Piya Mera Jiya Laage Na" - Sulakshana Pandit
"Dil Mila Le O Abdulla" - Anuradha Paudwal, Chandrani Mukherjee
"Jaane Bahaar Yaaro Ka Yaar" - Kishore Kumar
"Maar Gayo Re Rasgulla Khilai Ke Maar Gayo Re" -  Mohammed Rafi, Anand Kumar C, Runa Laila (Bangladesh)

External links
 

1979 films
1970s Hindi-language films
Films scored by Bappi Lahiri